Palthis is a genus of litter moths of the family Erebidae. The genus was erected by Jacob Hübner in 1825.

Species
Palthis aeacalis Schaus, 1913
Palthis agroteralis (Guenée, 1854)
Palthis angulalis (Hübner, 1796) – dark-spotted palthis moth 
Palthis angustipennis Schaus, 1916
Palthis argenteicincta Dognin, 1914
Palthis asopialis (Guenée, 1854) – faint-spotted palthis moth
Palthis auca Möschler, 1880
Palthis bizialis (Walker, 1859)
Palthis calcabilis Dognin, 1914
Palthis calcalis Schaus, 1906
Palthis eubaealis Schaus, 1913
Palthis hieronymus Schaus, 1913
Palthis incuriosa Dyar, 1914
Palthis lineata Schaus, 1913
Palthis misantlalis Schaus, 1916
Palthis mophisalis (Walker, 1859)
Palthis obliqualis Dognin, 1914
Palthis oconequensis Dognin, 1914
Palthis orasiusalis Walker, 1859
Palthis phocionalis (Walker, [1859])
Palthis serapealis Schaus, 1916
Palthis spectalis (Guenée, 1854)
Palthis submarginata Schaus, 1913

References

Herminiinae
Moth genera